The 1912 Grand National was the 74th renewal of the Grand National horse race that took place at Aintree Racecourse near Liverpool, England, on 27 March 1912.

Owner Sir Charles Assheton-Smith would provide the winner again in 1913. He also owned the 1893 winner,
when he was known simply as Charles Duff.

Finishing Order

Non-finishers

References

 1912
Grand National
Grand National
20th century in Lancashire